Bao or Pao is the pinyin romanization of two Chinese surnames, 包 and 鮑/鲍. It could also be a sinification of the Mongolian surname Borjigin. It is also a Vietnamese surname.

List of people with surname 包
 Bao Zheng (999–1062), government official during the Song dynasty and the Chinese cultural icon of justice
 Bao Daoyi, fictional Song dynasty outlaw from the novel Water Margin
 Bao Zunxin (1937–2007), Chinese historian and dissident
 Bao Yingying (born 1983), Chinese sabre fencer
 Bao Bei'er (born 1984), Chinese actor
 Bao Yixin (born 1992), Chinese badminton player

List of people with surname 鮑/鲍
It is the 62nd name on the Hundred Family Surnames poem.
 Bao Shuya (died 644 BC), official under the Qi during the Spring and Autumn period
 Bao Xin (152–192), general during the Han dynasty
 Bao Xun (died 224), government official during the Han dynasty and later under the Wei during the Three Kingdoms period 
 Bao Sanniang, fictional character during the Three Kingdoms period
 Bao Xu, fictional Song dynasty outlaw from the novel Water Margin
 Bao Chao (1828–1886), Qing dynasty general and official
 Bao Tong (born 1932), former Chinese politician
 Bao Guo'an (born 1946), Chinese actor
 Bao Xishun (born 1951), ethnic Mongolian man from China recognized as the tallest man on earth
 Yih-Ho Michael Pao, American engineer
 Ellen Pao, American lawyer and corporate executive
 Bao Chunlai (born 1983), Chinese badminton player

References

Individual Chinese surnames
Chinese-language surnames
Multiple Chinese surnames